The Pearl Fishers is a 1963 Australian television production based on the opera Les pêcheurs de perles by Georges Bizet. It was filmed in Sydney at the ABC's Gore Hill studios and marked the one hundredth anniversary of the first performance of the opera.

Cast
Rosalind Keene (soprano) as Leila
Ronal Jackson (baritone) as Zurga
Raymond McDonald (tenor) as Nadir

Keene and Jackson appear in the production, but not McDonald; Edward Brayshaw mimes and lip-synchs the role of Nadir.

Reception
The critic from the Sydney Morning Herald wrote that, "it may be that producer William Stirling doubted that the music could hold the viewers' interest should the action flag for a moment, for his sets were distractingly cluttered up at times. He also used such film techniques as flashbacks, and in the love duel the closeup was excessive. The flames in which Ronal Jackson expired at the end of the opera were a further innovation; such an impressively elaborate production obviously cried out for colour television."

The production sold widely overseas.

References

External links

Australian television films
1963 television plays
Films based on operas
Australian Broadcasting Corporation original programming
Opera films
Films directed by William Sterling (director)
1960s English-language films